Acantholycosa altaiensis is a species of wolf spider only known from the Tigiretsky Mountain Range in the Russian part of the Altai Mountains.

This uniformly dark brown spider is up to 9 mm in length. It can only be separated from its closest congeners by details of the genitalia.

References

Lycosidae
Spiders described in 2003
Spiders of Russia